Sven Viktor Davidson (13 July 1928 – 28 May 2008) was a Swedish tennis player who became the first Swede to win a Grand Slam title when he won the French Championships in 1957, beating Ashley Cooper and Herbert Flam.

Career
Davidson also reached the French championships final in the two previous years. In 1955 he beat Budge Patty before losing to Tony Trabert. In 1956 he beat Flam and Cooper before losing to Lew Hoad. He also reached the Wimbledon semi finals in 1957 (beating Seixas before losing to Lew Hoad). At the 1957 U. S. Championships, Davidson lost in five sets in the semifinals to Mal Anderson. In 1958 Davidson partnered with Ulf Schmidt to win the doubles title at the Wimbledon Championships defeating the Australian pair Ashley Cooper and Neale Fraser in three straight sets. He played his last Grand Slam event at Wimbledon in 1959.

Davidson reached a career-high singles ranking of World No. 2.

He played for the Swedish Davis Cup team between 1950 and 1960.

Davidson was inducted into the International Tennis Hall of Fame in 2007.

Personal life

Davidson lived in Arcadia, California since the 1970s. In 1981, at age 52, he suffered a heart attack while playing a tennis match in Los Angeles. He died in Arcadia on 28 May 2008 as a result of pneumonia.

Grand Slam finals

Singles (1 title, 2 runners-up)

Doubles (1 title)

Grand Slam tournament performance timeline

Singles

References

External links
 
 
 
 

1928 births
2008 deaths
People from Borås
French Championships (tennis) champions
Swedish expatriates in the United States
Swedish male tennis players
International Tennis Hall of Fame inductees
Wimbledon champions (pre-Open Era)
Grand Slam (tennis) champions in men's singles
Grand Slam (tennis) champions in men's doubles
Sportspeople from Västra Götaland County